Trigger Trail is a 1944 American Western film directed by Lewis D. Collins and starring Rod Cameron.

Premise
A cowboy (Rod Cameron) intervenes when greedy businessmen try to trick homesteaders into forfeiting their land.

Cast 
 Rod Cameron as Clint Farrel
 Fuzzy Knight as Echo
 Eddie Dew as Sheriff Bob Reynolds
 Vivian Austin as Ann Catlett
 Ray Whitley as Gilroy
 Lane Chandler as Slade
 George Eldredge as Rance Hudson
 Robert 'Buzz' Henry as Chip Kincaid (as 'Buzz' Henry)
 Davison Clark as Silas Farrel
 Michael Vallon as Bender
 Richard Alexander as Henchman Waco (as Dick Alexander)
 Jack Rockwell as Joe Kincaid
 Budd Buster as Tug Cattlet
 The Six Bar Cowboys as cowhands / musicians (as the Bar-Six Cowboys)

See also
 List of American films of 1944

External links

1944 films
1944 Western (genre) films
Universal Pictures films
American Western (genre) films
Films directed by Lewis D. Collins
1940s English-language films
American black-and-white films
1940s American films